Oak Island, also known as the William Seabrook, Jr. House, is a historic plantation house located at Edisto Island, Charleston County, South Carolina. It was built about 1828–1831, and is a -story, five bay, rectangular, central-hall, frame, weatherboard-clad residence with a projecting two-story rear pavilion.  It features two, massive, interior chimneys with heavily corbelled caps and a one-story, wraparound hipped roof porch.

It was listed on the National Register of Historic Places in 1986.

References

External links

Plantation houses in South Carolina
Historic American Buildings Survey in South Carolina
Houses on the National Register of Historic Places in South Carolina
Houses completed in 1831
Houses in Charleston County, South Carolina
National Register of Historic Places in Charleston County, South Carolina